Mesophryne beipiaoensis is an extinct species of frog, from the Cretaceous Yixian Formation of Liaoning (China), and the only species in the genus Mesophryne. While some authors have suggested Mesophryne is a synonym of Liaobatrachus, this has been rejected by other authors. In a phylogenetic analysis it was found to be a crown group frog, which was more derived than Ascaphus and Leiopelma, but less so than alytids and other more advanced frogs.

References

Early Cretaceous frogs
Fossil taxa described in 2001
Prehistoric amphibians of Asia
Prehistoric amphibian genera